The Communist Party of Canada - Marxist-Leninist (CPC-ML) ran ten candidates in the 2003 Ontario provincial election.  They did not use the CPC-ML name but instead campaigned as "Independent Renewal" candidates.

Former CPC-ML leader Hardial Bains had made a public call for grass-roots Canadian democratic renewal in the early 1990s.  The CPC-ML initially planned to re-register with Elections Canada as the Canadian Party of Renewal in 1993, and there was an unregistered Ontario Renewal Party affiliated with the CPC-ML in the 1995 provincial election.

Many of these candidates have campaigned federally for the CPC-ML.  No provincial wing of the CPC-ML was recognized by Elections Ontario.  Unless otherwise noted, all federal candidacies mentioned below occurred under the auspices of the CPC-ML.

List
Frank Chilelli (Bramalea—Gore—Malton—Springdale)
Janice Murray (Etobicoke—Lakeshore)
Kelly Greenaway (Hamilton East)
Jamila Ghaddar (Hamilton West)
Julian Ichim (Kitchener—Waterloo)
Pierre Chénier (Mississauga East)
Philip Fernandez (Toronto Centre—Rosedale)
Nick Lin (Trinity—Spadina)
Saroj Bains (Windsor—St. Clair)
Enver Villamizar (Windsor West)

External links
The CPC-ML's official endorsement of the ten Independent Renewal candidates.

Candidates in Ontario provincial elections
Ontario 2003